Casey Stern (born October 17, 1978, in Massapequa, New York) is an American television personality and radio host who currently works for Turner Sports and Sirius XM Radio.

Career
Stern departed MLB.com's BaseballChannel.tv, formerly MLB Radio where he was most recently host of the Fantasy 411. On April 28, 2006, he began hosting a half-hour television show on the Baseball Channel on MLB.com called MLB.com Midday. Stern hosted "State of the RedSox.com Nation" on the Redsox.com until November 7. Peter McCarthy now hosts "State of the RedSox.com Nation". McCarthy took over from Stern on Under the Lights. He also used to host Under the Lights on MLB Radio but left in November 2005 to pursue video at MLB.com.

Stern is also a die-hard New York Mets fan and hosted "Next Stop Shea" on Mets.com. Stern hosted The Bottom Line on the Baseball Channel which took over from Stayin' Hot with Seth and Bone when Darryl Hamilton left to work for MLB. He previously co-hosted the Fantasy 411 on the Baseball Channel with longtime hosts, Mike Siano and Cory Schwartz.

Turner Sports
During the October 17, 2015 TBS postgame coverage of Game 1 of the NLCS, Stern issued an on-air apology for the apparent use of profanity when sending the broadcast to commercial.  He took full responsibility for the "hot mic" incident and apologized to anybody he offended.

On March 31 and December 15, 2016, he hosted TNT's pregame and postshow NBA coverage, including Inside the NBA, substituting for Ernie Johnson. He hosted the show of December 15, filling in for Johnson because of a family illness, on a day that was devoted to the death of sideline reporter Craig Sager.

On August 26, 2016, Turner Sports reached a multi-year agreement with Stern to join Turner as a studio host for the MLB on TBS and the NBA on TNT, as well as NCAA March Madness, replacing colleague Matt Winer. Stern was later removed from March Madness for the 2020 NCAA tournament, which was canceled due to the Coronavirus outbreak, as he was to be replaced by CBS's Adam Zucker.

Personal life
Stern grew up in Massapequa and spent 13 years, as an adult, living in Seaford.

References

External links
BaseballChannel.tv page on MLB.com
MLB.coms Host Information Page
Next Stop Shea show page
The Midday show page – Bottom line show archive is on this page.
The Fantasy 411 blog

Living people
1978 births
People from Massapequa, New York
People from Seaford, New York
Participants in American reality television series
Major League Baseball broadcasters
National Basketball Association broadcasters
American television sports anchors
American radio personalities